The southern bastard codling or bearded red cod (Pseudophycis barbata) is a morid cod of the genus Pseudophycis, found around southern Australia including Tasmania, and New Zealand, from the surface to 300 m.  Its length is up to 63 cm.

References
 
 Tony Ayling & Geoffrey Cox, Collins Guide to the Sea Fishes of New Zealand,  (William Collins Publishers Ltd, Auckland, New Zealand 1982) 

southern bastard codling
Marine fish of Southern Australia
southern bastard codling
southern bastard codling